Chongqing Wushan Airport , originally named Wushan Shennüfeng Airport is an airport serving Wushan County of China's Chongqing Municipality.

The airport is located at the border of Wushan and Fengjie counties,  from the county seat, and mainly serves tourists to the nearby Three Gorges region. Construction began on 20 April 2015, and the airport was opened on 16 August 2019. It is the fourth airport with regularly scheduled passenger service in the municipality of Chongqing.

Airlines and destinations

See also
List of airports in China
List of the busiest airports in China

References

Airports in Chongqing
Airports established in 2019
2019 establishments in China